Julian Davies can refer to:

 Julian Davies (author) (born 1954), an Australian author
 Julian Davies (judoka) (born 1971), a British judoka
 Julian Davies (microbiologist), a British microbiologist